The 2015–16 season was Chelsea Football Club's 102nd competitive season, 27th consecutive season in the top flight of English football, 24th consecutive season in the Premier League and 110th year in existence as a football club. They entered the season as reigning Premier League champions after winning the title for a fifth time in 2014–15, and also participated in the FA Cup, League Cup, FA Community Shield and UEFA Champions League.

The season was the first since 2003–04 without Petr Čech, who joined rivals Arsenal.

Kits
Supplier: adidas/ Sponsor: Yokohama Tyres.

Month-by-month review

June
Left winger Gaël Kakuta left the Blues to join La Liga side Sevilla, for a fee of £2.5 million.

Czech goalkeeper Petr Čech left the club to join London rivals Arsenal on a three-year deal. He played 486 games for the Blues in all competitions, winning four Premier League titles, four FA Cups, three League Cups, two Community Shields, one UEFA Champions League and one UEFA Europa League.

July
On 3 July, the Blues announced the signing of Radamel Falcao on a season-long loan deal from Monaco.

Young central midfielders Josh McEachran and Marco van Ginkel left the Blues. McEachran joined Championship club Brentford on a four-year deal for a reported £750,000, while Van Ginkel joined Stoke City on a year-long loan deal. Under-21 player Andreas Christensen also left on a season-long loan, joining Borussia Mönchengladbach, while Nathan and Isaiah Brown were loaned to Eredivisie club Vitesse Arnhem.

On 13 July, the Blues completed the signing of Bosnian goalkeeper Asmir Begović from Stoke City on a four-year deal for a reported £8 million. Patrick Bamford extended his contract for another three years and was loaned to Premier League outfit Crystal Palace.

José Mourinho also confirmed that Bertrand Traoré would be a part of his first-team plans for 2015–16, as would Victor Moses. On 28 July, left-back Filipe Luís left the Blues after just one year, moving back to former club Atlético Madrid for a reported £11.1 million.

August
Chelsea lost the 2015 FA Community Shield 1–0 to Arsenal thanks to an Alex Oxlade-Chamberlain goal in the 24th minute. Diego Costa missed the game through injury, and it was the first time Arsène Wenger defeated José Mourinho in 14 attempts.

On 3 August, Todd Kane signed a new three-year deal at the club, keeping him at the Blues until 2018. Young England forward Dominic Solanke joined fellow Blues players Izzy Brown, Lewis Baker, Nathan and Danilo Pantić on loan at Dutch Eredivisie team Vitesse Arnhem on a season long loan.

On 5 August, Chelsea lost 1–0 to Fiorentina.

Mohamed Salah joined Roma on a season-long loan and Todd Kane joined NEC Nijmegen. On 7 August, manager José Mourinho has signed a new four-year contract, keeping him at Stamford Bridge until at least 2019. Young centre-back Alex Davey joins Peterborough United on a one-month loan deal.

Chelsea started their Premier League campaign at home against Swansea City. Swansea came from behind twice to draw 2–2 with ten-man Chelsea. Oscar gave the Blues the lead before André Ayew drew Swansea level, yet Chelsea went in 2–1 up at the break thanks to a Federico Fernández own goal. Six minutes into the second half, Thibaut Courtois was sent off for a last-man foul on Bafétimbi Gomis; Gomis converted the resulting penalty to equalise for the Swans. This match involved an incident in which Eva Caneiro, the Chelsea team doctor, came on to treat Eden Hazard – an action for which she was later criticised by José Mourinho. Caneiro would later take the club to court and eventually won a £5 million settlement. This event, however, signalled the beginning of a downward spiral that would culminate in José Mourinho's sacking.

Oriol Romeu joined Southampton after four years as a Chelsea player in which he made 33 appearances, scoring once from the penalty spot against Wolverhampton Wanderers in 2012.

Nathan Aké signed a new five-year contract with Chelsea and will continue his development by spending this season on loan in the Premier League at Watford.

Manchester City hammered the Blues 3–0 at the City of Manchester Stadium, goals from Sergio Agüero, Vincent Kompany and Fernandinho condemning José Mourinho to his joint-heaviest defeat whilst in charge of Chelsea. Despite only being the second game of the season, Manchester City move five points ahead of the Blues. Directly after the game, German Bundesliga club FC Augsburg announce that Baba Rahman has signed for Chelsea for a reported fee of £21.7 million.

The Blues announce the signing of Barcelona winger Pedro for a reported £21.4 million, signing a four-year deal with Chelsea. Pedro has won the World Cup, European Championship, three UEFA Champions Leagues and numerous titles in Spain with Barça. Pedro will wear the number 17 shirt, which was given to him by Baba Rahman, the latter vacating it to number 6. The number 17 was previously worn by Eden Hazard and Mohamed Salah.

On 23 August, the Blues announced the signing of Kenedy from Fluminense, who will wear the number 16 shirt. Pedro stars on his Chelsea debut as he scores one and assists another as the Blues win their first game of the season against West Bromwich Albion. Thibaut Courtois saved a first half James Morrison penalty before goals from Pedro, Diego Costa and César Azpilicueta sent Chelsea in 3–1 up at the break. Despite having John Terry sent off in the 54th minute, Chelsea held on to claim all three points.

Chelsea are drawn away against Walsall in the Third Round Capital One Cup. While Juan Cuadrado signs on a year-long loan deal for Italian Serie A club Juventus.

In José Mourinho's 200th Premier League match (and 100th league match at home), Chelsea lost 2–1 to Crystal Palace at Stamford Bridge. This marked only the second time Mourinho had suffered a home defeat in the league as Chelsea manager, and it was also just his third home defeat in all competitions while in charge of Chelsea. Goals from Bakary Sako and Joel Ward either side of Radamel Falcao's first goal for the Blues sent Chelsea eight points behind leaders Manchester City.

September

On transfer deadline day, Chelsea announced the signing of Nantes defender Papy Djilobodji for a reported £2.7 million. Victor Moses extends his contract for another four years and is loaned to West Ham United. The Blues also signed Michael Hector for a reported £4 million from Reading; he was immediately loaned back to Reading for the entirety of the season.

First choice goalkeeper Thibaut Courtois is ruled out for up to three months with a knee injury. The Blues' poor form continued as they suffered another defeat, this time away at Everton. A Steven Naismith hat-trick condemned Chelsea to a third defeat after just five games, as many as they suffered in the entire previous season.

Chelsea win their first home game of the season as they defeat Maccabi Tel Aviv 4–0. Goals from Willian, Oscar, Diego Costa and Cesc Fàbregas sent the Blues top of Group G after one game. This victory was Chelsea's first clean sheet since the Blues won the title last May 1–0 against Crystal Palace.

Goals from Kurt Zouma and a Calum Chambers own goal gave Chelsea a 2–0 victory over nine-man Arsenal. Gabriel and Santi Cazorla were sent off for the Gunners, the former for kicking out at Diego Costa and the latter for receiving two yellow cards. The Blues also keep their first clean sheet of the 2015–16 Premier League season, Zouma's goal was his first in the Premier League for Chelsea. Two days after the game, both Chelsea and Arsenal were charged with failing to control their players and Costa was charged with an act of violent conduct for the incident that started the disturbance, where he slapped Laurent Koscielny in the face, which was not seen by the match officials but caught on video. Costa was given a three-match suspension, while Gabriel had his three-match suspension withdrawn after a "wrongful dismissal claim" from Arsenal and he was available for their next match.

Chelsea came from 2–0 down with ten minutes to play to secure a point away to Newcastle United thanks to late goals from substitutes Ramires and Willian. Ayoze Pérez and Georginio Wijnaldum sent the Magpies ahead before the Brazilian substitutes sent the Blues five points off the top four.

The Blues' last game in September finished in a 2–1 loss at Porto in a hard-fought game. Chelsea failed to claim a draw as goals from André André and Maicon sent Porto one point ahead of Chelsea.

October

Chelsea's poor start to the season continued as Southampton came from behind to record a victory at Stamford Bridge. The Blues have taken only eight points from a possible 24 this season and are only four above the relegation zone. After Saturday's home defeat, Chelsea have offered their full support to manager José Mourinho. Meanwhile, Blues captain John Terry says the 52-year-old Portuguese is the best person to help the club recover from their miserable start.
"If anyone is going to get us out of this hole it is going to be José Mourinho", said the 34-year-old defender.

The Blues defeat Aston Villa 2–0 at Stamford Bridge, with a Diego Costa goal and an Alan Hutton own goal. José Mourinho dropped Eden Hazard, Nemanja Matić and Gary Cahill and chose to start youngsters Ruben Loftus-Cheek and Baba Rahman. Four days later, Chelsea draw 0–0 with Ukrainian side Dynamo Kyiv, keeping them in third place one point behind the Ukrainian champions.

José Mourinho and Nemanja Matić were sent-off as Chelsea's miserable Premier League campaign continued with a 2–1 defeat at West Ham on 24 October. Mauro Zárate fired the Hammers in front when Chelsea failed to clear a corner. Matić was sent off after being booked twice in nine minutes before the break, and Mourinho joined him after speaking to referee Jon Moss at half-time.
Gary Cahill levelled from a corner but Andy Carroll met Aaron Cresswell's cross to send the Hammers to second in the table.

Chelsea crashed out of the League Cup in the fourth round after Jack Butland's penalty shootout heroics earned ten-man Stoke City a 5–4 spot-kick win that increased the pressure on José Mourinho. Jonathan Walters struck a goal worthy of winning any contest to give Stoke the lead early in the second half, before Loïc Rémy's injury-time equaliser took the tie the distance at the Britannia Stadium. After nine out of the first nine spot-kicks were clinically despatched—with the likes of Charlie Adam, Marko Arnautović, Oscar, Rémy and Willian successful—Eden Hazard saw his attempt brilliantly saved by Jack Butland, who earned his side a place in the last eight.

Philippe Coutinho scored twice as Liverpool came from behind to beat Chelsea 3–1 at Stamford Bridge on 31 October to ratchet up the pressure yet further on the beleaguered Mourinho. A Ramires header gave the Premier League champions the lead after just four minutes, but compatriot Coutinho fired Liverpool level in some style just before half-time. Oscar came close with a long-range chip, but chances were few and far between in the second half until another Coutinho effort clipped John Terry and flew past Asmir Begović. Christian Benteke made sure of the points with a composed finish in the closing minutes as Jürgen Klopp secured his first league win since taking charge of Liverpool.

November

Chelsea eased the pressure on manager José Mourinho as Willian's late winner gave them a crucial Champions League victory over Dynamo Kyiv at Stamford Bridge. The win moved the Blues into second place in Group G, three points behind leaders Porto, but now with a two-point cushion to Dynamo.

Premier League-wise, though, Chelsea continued their struggle as they lost in a 1–0 away game at Stoke City. Seeing Norwich City win, this left them 16th in the League and three points above relegation.

Chelsea recorded their first win in four Premier League matches as Diego Costa's first goal in seven games gave them a narrow victory over Norwich. The Blues finally broke through when Costa finished off Cesc Fàbregas' quickly taken free-kick. The home side were denied a second when Kurt Zouma's flick hit the crossbar.

The Blues also secured back to back wins, after defeating Maccabi Tel Aviv 4–0. Goals from Gary Cahill, Willian, Oscar and Kurt Zouma sent Chelsea closer to the knockout phase, needing only one point home against Porto.

Tottenham Hotspur extended their unbeaten run in the Premier League to a club record 13 games with a 0–0 draw against Chelsea at White Hart Lane. Neither goalkeeper was to beaten before the final whistle, leaving Mourinho's side 14th in the table with one win in their last five Premier League matches.

December

Glenn Murray scored a dramatic late winning goal as AFC Bournemouth recorded one of the most famous wins in their history against Chelsea at Stamford Bridge. The substitute had been on the pitch for just 99 seconds before he bundled home the winner. Mourinho's side, who sit 14th in the table, have now suffered eight defeats in 15 league games and Eden Hazard's goalless streak stretching to 25 games in all competitions.

Chelsea advanced to the Champions League knockout stage with a 2–0 victory, which eliminated opponents Porto and sent the Portuguese side into the Europa League. Costa, on the bench in the Blues' last two games, had a hand in the opening goal when his saved effort rebounded in off Iván Marcano and Willian scored the second goal.

The Blues lost their ninth Premier League game (out of sixteen) of the season, while Leicester City moved to the top of the Premier League, in a 2–1 loss on Monday. This left the defending champions just one point clear of the relegation. Jamie Vardy scored for the sixth consecutive Premier League home match and Riyad Mahrez scored the second goal before Loïc Rémy could halve the deficit with 13 minutes remaining.

On 17 December, after the loss against Leicester City and after losing nine out of sixteen league games, manager José Mourinho was sacked by Chelsea. Former Netherlands boss Guus Hiddink was appointed interim Chelsea manager until the end of the season following the sacking of Mourinho. The Dutchman was to be at Stamford Bridge for Sunderland's match, but Steve Holland took control of team matters for the game alongside Eddie Newton, who now took on the role of assistant first-team coach.

Chelsea began their second post-José Mourinho era by scoring three goals in the Premier League for the first time in nearly four months to beat Sunderland. Fabio Borini pulled one back for Sunderland when he bundled in from close range, but that was not enough to take it to a comeback. The day was marked by fan protests and shows of support for Mourinho.

On Boxing Day, Diego Costa scored twice as Guus Hiddink's second spell as Chelsea boss started with a 2–2 draw against Watford.

On 28 December, keepers David de Gea and Thibaut Courtois were the stars of the show as Manchester United and Chelsea drew 0–0.

January

Chelsea secured their first victory in Hiddink's second spell as boss to move six points clear of relegation with a win at Crystal Palace. A first-half goal from Oscar gave the Blues the lead at Selhurst Park, before second-half strikes from Willian and Diego Costa secured all three points.

John Swift extended his loan with Championship club Brentford until the end of the season. Additionally, both Patrick Bamford and Christian Atsu returned to the club following their loan spells with Crystal Palace and Bournemouth respectively.

On 10 January, Chelsea advanced to the fourth round of the FA Cup, defeating Football League One side Scunthorpe United 2–0. Ruben Loftus-Cheek scored the second goal, the first of his senior career at Chelsea.

On 24 January, Chelsea earned a 1–0 victory over Arsenal after a first-half goal from Diego Costa. With this win, Chelsea moved past West Bromwich Albion into 13th in the league over goal difference with 28 points.

On 31 January, Chelsea rounded out the month with a 5–1 victory over Championship side MK Dons in the fourth round of the FA Cup. The Blues will host Manchester City in the fifth round on 21 February.

February
Chelsea began the month with back-to-back draws against league opponents Watford and Manchester United, 0–0 and 1–1, respectively. The draw against Manchester United was marred by a serious knee injury to Kurt Zouma, which would rule him out until the following season.

Chelsea returned to their winning ways on 13 February, dominating Newcastle United 5–1 at Stamford Bridge. Chelsea led 2–0 within ten minutes thanks to goals from Diego Costa and Pedro. Costa later set up Willian, who finished to make the lead three goals at the 17 minute mark. In the second half, Pedro added a second goal, and Bertrand Traoré scored his first league goal to make it 5–0. The Magpies got a 90th-minute goal through Andros Townsend, but it was little consolation as the rout ended in favor of the Blues. The only other blemish of the game was a hamstring injury to club captain John Terry, who missed the next match.

Chelsea then faced Paris Saint-Germain in the first leg of the UEFA Champions League round of 16. Chelsea were without John Terry and Kurt Zouma, due to injuries, and Nemanja Matić, as he had been suspended for accumulating two yellow cards. Because of this, Chelsea started Gary Cahill and Branislav Ivanović at centre back, and Baba Rahman and César Azpilicueta at full-back. The Parisians dominated possession throughout much of the half and eventually capitalized in the 39th minute. Chelsea midfielder John Obi Mikel conceded a foul just outside the 18-yard box. PSG forward Zlatan Ibrahimović's free kick deflected off Mikel, who was part of the wall, and past goalkeeper Thibaut Courtois. Just a few minutes later, however, Chelsea equalised through Mikel from a stoppage time corner kick. PSG regained their lead late in the game as Edinson Cavani, who had only entered the match moments prior as a substitute, broke through the Chelsea back line and beat Courtois. The lead would hold, with PSG holding a 2–1 lead heading into the second leg.

Five days after the loss in Paris, Chelsea bounced back with a 5–1 win against Manchester City in the fifth round of the FA Cup. City manager Manuel Pellegrini chose to play a weakened squad that featured five youth players making their senior debuts. Chelsea struck first, Diego Costa scoring on a 35th-minute header. However, City immediately responded, with David Faupala scoring on his senior debut and tying the score going to halftime. However, Faupala's goal was the last glimmer of hope, as Chelsea would score four times in the second half. Four different Chelsea players scored in the second half: Willian, Gary Cahill, Eden Hazard, and Bertrand Traoré. The final score was 5–1. Later that day, Chelsea drew Everton as their opponent in the sixth round, to be played on 12 March.

March

Chelsea began March with a victory against Norwich City on the first day of the month. Chelsea scored just 39 seconds into the match behind a strike from Kenedy, a natural winger who had lined up as a left back. Having taken the lead in the first minute, Chelsea later doubled it in the final minute of the first half, with Diego Costa scoring in stoppage time. Norwich would cut the Blues' lead to one after a 68th-minute goal from Nathan Redmond. However, Chelsea would manage to hold on to their lead and win. The final score was 2–1.

Four days later, Chelsea faced off with Stoke City. Chelsea scored through Bertrand Traoré in the 39th minute. Chelsea maintained their lead, but Mame Biram Diouf would equalize in the 85th. This score would hold, a 1–1 draw.

On 9 March, Chelsea lost 1–2 (2–4 on aggregate) to PSG in the second leg of the Champions League round of 16. Adrien Rabiot put PSG ahead 16 minutes into the match. Chelsea's Diego Costa equalised 11 minutes later, putting the aggregate score 3–2 in favor of PSG. A second Chelsea goal would have forced extra time, and they looked the better side for the remainder of the second half, but failed to score such a goal on several chances. In the 60th minute, Costa went to ground with an injury and had to be replaced by Bertrand Traoré. Seven minutes later, Zlatan Ibrahimović connected with an Ángel Di María cross. This all but ended any chances of a Chelsea comeback, as, due to the away goals rule, would have needed to score three goals in just over 20 minutes. Chelsea failed to score even one, let alone three, and the score ended 1–2 (2–4 on aggregate) in favor of PSG.

On 12 March, Chelsea lost 2–0 away to Everton in the sixth round of the FA Cup. Former Chelsea's player Romelu Lukaku scored both goals for Everton. As of 12 March, Chelsea were eliminated from all knockout competitions and sat 10th in the league.

On 19 March, Chelsea earned a 2–2 draw with London rivals West Ham United at Stamford Bridge. West Ham United opened the scoring with a fantastic long range shot from Manuel Lanzini which sailed past Thibaut Courtois in the 17th minute. However, just before the half time break Spaniard Cesc Fàbregas equalized with a sublime free-kick. West Ham United re-took the lead in the 61st minute courtesy of substitute Andy Carroll. However, Chelsea replied again this time in the 88th minute after Ruben Loftus-Cheek was brought down by Michail Antonio in the penalty area, therefore earning the Blues a penalty with seconds of normal time remaining. Chelsea then found their second equalizer of the match after Cesc Fàbregas converted the penalty comfortably past goalkeeper Adrián.

April

Chelsea began the month with a 4–0 away victory at Villa Park, beating a struggling Aston Villa side. Matt Miazga, Alexandre Pato and Jake Clarke-Salter all made their first-team debuts for Chelsea. Chelsea took the lead through Ruben Loftus-Cheek after his shot was deflected by Villa defender Joleon Lescott. The Blues then doubled their advantage through an Alexandre Pato penalty, after he was brought down in the area by Aly Cissokho. Pato had replaced the injured Loïc Rémy in the 23rd minute. Chelsea then scored a third through Pedro a minute into the second half. Pedro scored a second after a Pato shot was parried away by Villa goalkeeper Brad Guzan and found its way to the feet of the Spaniard.

On 4 April, Chelsea announced that Antonio Conte would become the new first team head coach at the start of the 2016–17 campaign.

On 9 April, Chelsea lost 1–0 at Swansea, with the Swans scoring through Gylfi Sigurðsson.

On 16 April, Chelsea lost 3–0 at home to Manchester City, the same scoreline as the previous league meeting between the two sides in August 2015.

On 23 April, Chelsea played away at Bournemouth. Chelsea got on the board early with a goal from Pedro, followed by two Hazard goals and a Willian goal. Hazard scored three goals in the Premier League this season. Fabregas contributed three assists in the win.

May

Chelsea went winless throughout the month of May, managing three draws and a loss. Their first game of the month on 2 May was a 2–2 draw to Tottenham Hotspur in which Chelsea came back from being 2–0 down at half time, to secure a point against Tottenham and effectively end their London rival's hopes of obtaining the Premier League title, as Tottenham dropping points meant that they were mathematically unable to surpass Leicester at the top of the table. The opening goals for Tottenham came from Kane in the 35th minute and Son Heung-min's low strike in the 44th minute. The match seemed to be decided until Chelsea returned fire in the second half with Cahill lashing in a goal from distance in the 58th minute, and Hazard then scored a goal in the 83rd minute to continue to regain his form after not having scored until April, and to maintain Chelsea's unbeaten streak at home against Tottenham for the 26th year in a row.

Chelsea's next game was a 3–2 away loss to Sunderland on 7 May, which proved to be crucial for the home side's survival in the top flight of English football, at the time moving Sunderland up to 17th in the table and one point clear of their bitter rivals Newcastle United. Chelsea scored the opening goal with a precise finishing strike from Diego Costa in the 14th minute, giving them the lead until Sunderland equalised with a 41st minute volley from Khazri. Chelsea regained the lead seven minutes later in added time with a goal from Nemanja Matić to put them 2–1 up at half time. Sunderland were to turn the game on its head in the second half with two goals in the span of three minutes from Fabio Borini and Jermain Defoe, scored in the 67th and 70th minute. Chelsea were unable to fight back for a draw as Sunderland held on for the three points which would boost their survival hopes. Chelsea remained 9th in the table following the result, possessing a better goal difference than Stoke City in 10th position.

Chelsea's penultimate game of the season and their last away fixture was a 1–1 draw with Liverpool at Anfield, on 11 May. After a slow start, Eden Hazard found the net again, continuing an improved run of form with a 32nd minute solo goal to put the Blues in front. The game remained uneventful until Christian Benteke equalised for Liverpool, with a header in the 2nd minute of added time during the second half, claiming a point for the Merseyside club and increasing the team's unbeaten home streak to 12 games.

Chelsea's final game of the 2015–16 Premier League season on 15 May resulted in another 1–1 draw, this time at home to champions Leicester City whom they had failed to defend their title against from the previous season. The game remained goalless until the 66th minute with Cesc Fàbregas scoring a penalty. Leicester responded quickly with a goal from Danny Drinkwater fourteen minutes later, to conclude the campaign with Chelsea finishing 10th due to a win from Stoke City sending the club above Chelsea in the table. Chelsea's tenth-place finish marked the club's lowest finish in the Premier League since the 1995–96 season, in which they finished 11th. It also marked the worst defence of a title in the Premier League's 24-year history, and confirmed the club's absence from European competition in the 2016/17 season.

Club

Coaching staff

{|class="wikitable"
|-
!Position
!Staff
|-
|First-team Manager|| Guus Hiddink
|-
|rowspan="2"|Assistant Manager|| Steve Holland
|-
| Eddie Newton
|-
|Technical Director|| Michael Emenalo
|-
|Goalkeeper Coach|| Christophe Lollichon
|-
|Fitness Coach|| Chris Jones
|-
|Assistant Fitness Coach|| Carlos Lalin
|-
|Senior Opposition Scout|| Mick McGiven
|-
|Medical Director|| Paco Biosca
|-
|Head of Youth Development|| Neil Bath
|-
|Under-21 Team Manager|| Adi Viveash
|-
|Under-18 Team Manager|| Joe Edwards
|-
|Head of Match Analysis/Scout|| James Melbourne
|-
|International Head Coach|| Dermot Drummy
|-

Other information

|-
  Eugene Tenenbaum

Squad information

First team squad

 HG1 = Association-trained player
 HG2 = Club-trained player
 U21 = Under-21 player

New contracts

Transfers

In

Summer

Winter

Out

Summer

Winter

Loan in

Summer

Winter

Loan out
Chelsea have had 37 players spend time out on loan in 2015–16, with five playing for two different clubs. Stipe Perica had signed a deal to spend the entire season out on loan prior to the 2015–16 season, while a further 29 exited for the entire season by the end of the summer transfer window. Six would return prematurely prior to or during the winter window, but by its close four of that group had exited on new deals to the end of the campaign. John Swift, who joined Brentford on 1 October ultimately had his loan extended to the end of the season, while two further players exited on new season-long deals in January.

Summer

Winter

Overall transfer activity

Spending
Summer:  £64,450,000

Winter:  £3,500,000

Total:  £67,950,000

Income
Summer:  £35,200,000

Winter:  £25,000,000

Total:  £60,200,000

Expenditure
Summer:  £29,250,000

Winter:  £21,500,000

Total:  £7,750,000

Pre-season

On 28 April 2015, the schedule for the 2015 International Champions Cup was announced that Chelsea would play New York Red Bulls, Paris Saint-Germain, Barcelona and Fiorentina.

Competitions

Overall

Overview

{| class="wikitable" style="text-align: center"
|-
!rowspan=2|Competition
!colspan=8|Record
|-
!
!
!
!
!
!
!
!
|-
| Premier League

|-
| FA Cup

|-
| League Cup

|-
| Champions League

|-
| FA Community Shield

|-
! Total

FA Community Shield

Premier League

League table

Results summary

Results by matchday

Score overview

Matches

The fixtures for the 2015–16 season were announced on 17 June 2015 at 9am.

FA Cup

League Cup

UEFA Champions League

Chelsea qualified for the Group Stage of the 2015–16 UEFA Champions League by winning the 2014–15 Premier League. Having previously been seeded in pot 1 for the Champions League drew as one of the top eight ranked teams in UEFA, Chelsea would remain staying in pot 1 despite the changes to UEFA qualification rules, where pot 1 for group stage draws would now consist of the Champions League holders and the champions of the seven highest ranked associations. The group stage draw was made on 27 August 2015 in Monaco, France. Chelsea were to face Porto, Dynamo Kyiv and Maccabi Tel Aviv. Scoring a total of 13 points, Chelsea advanced to the knockout stage as group winners by winning against Porto, and sending the Portuguese side to the Europa League, in the last round.

Group stage

Knockout phase

Round of 16

Statistics

Appearances

Top scorers
The list is sorted by shirt number when total goals are equal.

Clean sheets
The list is sorted by shirt number when total appearances are equal.

Summary

Awards

Player

References

Chelsea
Chelsea F.C. seasons
Chelsea